Boren is a municipality in the district of Schleswig-Flensburg, in Schleswig-Holstein, Germany. It is situated near Denmark, on the Schlei inlet, on the south side of the peninsula Angeln.

References

Schleswig-Flensburg